A Settegast is a standard medical x-ray projection that presents a tangential view of the patella.

To acquire such an image the patient is placed in a prone position with the knee flexed at least 90 degrees and the field of view centered on the patellofemoral joint space.

See also
Settegast (surname)

References
Kenneth L. Bontrager and John P. Lampignano Bontrager's Handbook of Radiographic Positioning and Techniques. Elsevier Health Sciences, 2013

X-rays